The 1976 Tulsa Golden Hurricane football team represented the University of Tulsa during the 1976 NCAA Division I football season. In their fifth year under head coach F. A. Dry, the Golden Hurricane compiled a 7–4–1 record, 2–1–1 against Missouri Valley Conference opponents, and tied for the conference championship.

The team's statistical leaders included Ronnie Hickerson with 1,554 passing yards, Rickey Watts with 464 rushing yards, and Cornell Webster with 622 receiving yards.

Schedule

References

Tulsa
Tulsa Golden Hurricane football seasons
Missouri Valley Conference football champion seasons
Tulsa Golden Hurricane football